Cool Center is a Philippine television comedy talk show broadcast by GMA Network. Hosted by Eugene Domingo and Anjo Yllana, it premiered on March 14, 2009 replacing Nuts Entertainment. The show concluded on April 17, 2010 with a total of 55 episodes. It was replaced by Comedy Bar in its timeslot.

Hosts

 Eugene Domingo
 Anjo Yllana
 BB Gandanghari

Former hosts
 Arf Arf
 Sam Y.G. as Shivaker
 Ely Cruz Ramirez as Mr. Cariñoso

2009 segments
Love Advice from either Mr. Cariñoso or Shivaker (Sam Y.G.)
A caller asks love advice from either Mr. Cariñoso or Shivaker, with Mr. Cariñoso referring his advice from the caller's birthday, while Shivaker bases his advice from a popular song.
Hubad na Katotohanan (The Naked Truth)
A sexy model strips her clothes when one of the gossips asked were true.
Wanted Honey
Two callers meet each other for the first time.
Magbulabog ng Artista (Surprise an Artist)
Calling of a local celebrity at their home to catch up on what is new regarding their careers
Sadako Paroon
a play on the phrase "sa daku paroon" which means "over there" inserting the name of the infamous ghost from the Japanese "Ring" movie series.
Basically a look into the caller's future with the use of a medium.
Tawag ng Panganailangan (Call of Need)
A famous actor/actress is auctioning his/her valuables in time of need.

Ratings
According to AGB Nielsen Philippines' Mega Manila household television ratings, the pilot episode of Cool Center earned a 13.9% rating. While the final episode scored a 6.5 rating.

Accolades

References

External links
 

2009 Philippine television series debuts
2010 Philippine television series endings
Filipino-language television shows
GMA Network original programming
Philippine television talk shows